South Gower A.F.C. is a football club based in Scurlage in Wales, currently playing in the West Wales Premier League, having the previous season been part of the Swansea Senior Football League Division Two. They have previously played in the Welsh Football League.

During the 2008–09 season South Gower were playing in the Swansea Senior League Division One when it was decided that the club should apply for membership to the Welsh Football League. Towards the end of the season the ground was redeveloped the meet Welsh Football Ground Criteria, following an inspection membership was granted. The club finished second in the division as runners-up to Ragged School. The club took up promotion to the Welsh Football League spending two seasons in the Welsh Football League Division Three finishing 10th from 18 clubs in 2009–10 and 16th from 18 clubs in 2010–11.  Following on from this the club returned to the Swansea Senior Football League.

For the 2020–21 season the club joined the newly formed Tier 4 West Wales Premier League.

Staff and Board members
 1st Team Manager : Adrian Giardelli
 1st Team Coach: Sean Harris
 Secretary : Jeff Higgins
 Treasurer : Paul Lancey
 Vice-President: Mike Lee

Honours
Swansea Senior Football League Division One – Runners-up: 2008–09
West Wales Intermediate Cup – Winners: 2008-09
West Wales Intermediate Cup – Runners-up: 2005–06

References

External links
Official Club Twitter
 Official club Facebook

Sport in Swansea
Football clubs in Wales
Association football clubs established in 1945
1945 establishments in Wales
Welsh Football League clubs
West Wales Premier League clubs
Swansea Senior League clubs